Stand Up may refer to:

Arts, entertainment, and media
 Stand-up comedy, a comic style in which a comedian performs in front of a live audience

Film
 Stand Up (2007 film), a film featuring Modi Rosenfeld
 Stand Up (2008 film), a British film by Joseph Pierce
 Stand Up (2019 film), a Malayalam film directed by Vidhu Vincent
 The Stand Up, a 2011 comedy/drama written and directed by David Wexler

Music
 Stand Up! Records, an American record label
 Stand Up (band), an American melodic hardcore band recording for CI Records

Albums
 Stand Up (Dave Matthews Band album) or the title song, "Stand Up (For It)", 2005
 Stand Up (Everyday Sunday album) or the title song, 2002
 Stand Up (Jethro Tull album), 1969
 Stand Up (Right Said Fred album) or the title song (see below), 2002
 Stand Up (Steve Morse Band album) or the title song, 1985
 Stand Up (EP) or the title song, by Big Bang, 2008
 Stand Up! (album) or the title song, by the Archers, 1979
 Stand Up, by Blue King Brown, 2006
 Stand Up, by Final Conflict, 1997
 Stand Up, by Leslie Cheung, 1986
 Stand Up, by Mel McDaniel, or the title song (see below), 1985
 Stand Up, an EP by Throwing Muses, 1984

Songs
 "Stand Up" (All That Remains song), 2012
 "Stand Up" (Cynthia Erivo song), 2019
 "Stand Up" (Dirty Werk song), 2018
 "Stand Up" (The Feelers song), 2004; covered by Stan Walker (2010)
 "Stand Up" (James Cottriall song), 2012
 "Stand Up" (Jet song), 2007
 "Stand Up" (Jimmy Barnes song), 1993
 "Stand Up!" (Lead song), 2008
 "Stand Up" (Love Tribe song), 1996
 "Stand Up" (Ludacris song), 2003
 "Stand Up" (Mai Kuraki song), 2001
 "Stand Up" (Mel McDaniel song), 1985
 "Stand Up" (Scribe song), 2003
 "Stand Up" (Trapt song), 2005
 "Stand Up" (The Triffids song), 1981
 "Stand Up (For the Champions)", by Right Said Fred, 2002
 "Stand Up (Kick Love into Motion)", by Def Leppard, 1993
 "Stand Up!", a chant by football supporters to the tune of "Go West"
 "Stand Up", by 8Ball & MJG from Ridin' High
 "Stand Up", by AC/DC from Fly on the Wall
 "Stand Up", by Al Green from Call Me
 "Stand Up", by Bobby Womack from The Poet
 "Stand Up", by the Cab from Lock Me Up
 "Stand Up", by Cheryl Cole from 3 Words
 "Stand Up", by David Lee Roth from Skyscraper
 "Stand Up", by the Dead 60s from Time to Take Sides
 "Stand Up", by Fireflight from Unbreakable
 "Stand Up", by Flobots from Fight with Tools
 "Stand Up", by Hazell Dean
 "Stand Up", by James Bay from Electric Light
 "Stand Up", by Jessie J from Who You Are
 "Stand Up", by Jolin Tsai
 "Stand Up", by KC and the Sunshine Band from The Painter
 "Stand Up", by Minor Threat from Flex Your Head
 "Stand Up", by One Direction from Up All Night
 "Stand Up", by Pennywise from The Fuse
 "Stand Up", by the Prodigy from Invaders Must Die
 "Stand Up", by Prussian Blue
 "Stand Up", by Rick Springfield from the movie soundtrack Hard to Hold
 "Stand Up", by Santana from Marathon
 "Stand Up", by Seeed from Next!
 "Stand Up", by Shaggy from Clothes Drop
 "Stand Up", by Stan Walker from From the Inside Out
 "Stand Up", by Steel Dragon from the soundtrack of the film Rock Star
 "Stand Up", by Throwing Muses from Throwing Muses
 "Stand Up", by T.I. from Urban Legend
 "Stand Up", by Underworld from Change the Weather
 "Stand Up", by Woe, Is Me from American Dream
 "Stand Up", by X1 from Emergency: Quantum Leap

Radio and television
 Stand Up! with Pete Dominick, a comedy talk show on Sirius XM
 Stand Up! (Japanese TV series), a 2003 drama series
 Stand Up, a 1995 installment of the American anthology series CBS Schoolbreak Special

Other uses
 Stand Up! for Democracy in DC Coalition, a citizens' advocacy group
 STAND UP, an education initiative funded by the Bill & Melinda Gates Foundation
 Stand-up fighting, a type of hand-to-hand combat
 Stand-up meeting, a daily team meeting, in agile software development

See also
 
 Stand Up and Cheer (disambiguation)
 Stand Up, Stand Up, a 2009 EP by Hanson
 Stood Up (disambiguation)